is a Japanese actor.

Filmography

TV
 Higurashi When They Cry (BS SkyPerfect TV, 2016) – Kyōsuke Irie
Crow's Blood (Hulu, 2016)
ROOKIES (TBS, 2008, ep 8 - 9)
Hana Yori Dango (TBS, 2005)
Medaka (Fuji TV, 2004, ep 3)
Stand Up!! (TBS, 2003)
Toshiie and Matsu (NHK, 2002)
Handoku (TBS, 2001)
Seija no Koushin (TBS, 1998)

Films
Ju-on: The Curse 2 (2000)
All About Lily Chou-Chou (2001)
Fifteen (2001)
Hana and Alice (2004) – Masashi Miyamoto 
School Days (2005)
 Rainbow Song (2006)
Yoru no Picnic / Night Time Picnic (2006)
Kyōfu (2010)
Household X (2011) – Hiroaki
 The Case of Hana & Alice (2014 anime) – Asanaga-sensei
 Gantz: O (2016 CG anime film) – Jōichirō Nishi
 Mesuneko-tachi / Female Cats (2017) - Takada
For Him to Live (2019)

References

External links
 
 

Actors from Kobe
Japanese male film actors
Japanese male television actors
1984 births
Living people
20th-century Japanese male actors
21st-century Japanese male actors